Giuseppe Cozza-Luzi (24 December 1837 – 1 June 1905) was an Italian savant and abbot of the Basilian monastery of Grottaferrata near Rome.

Biography
Cozza-Luzi was born in 1837 at Bolsena in the Province of Rome. In early youth he entered the ancient monastery of which he became abbot in 1882. Pius IX was attracted by his scholarship, as was later Leo XIII.
 
In 1898 he was freed from all official cares and devoted himself to his beloved studies. He won distinction by his edition of several ancient Vatican manuscripts and was also learned in the history of art and in archaeology.
 
He died in Rome on 1 June 1905.

Works
Under his direction the phototype edition of the Codex Vaticanus Graecus 1209 was executed, (Vetus et Novum Testamentum e Cod. Vaticano 1209 phototyp., 5 volumes fol., Rome, 1889), also a Vatican codex of the prophets (ibid., 1889), and from a Vatican manuscript the miniatures of Giulio Clovio to Dante's Paradiso. Nearly all the copies of these artistic publications perished at the burning of the Danesi establishment in Rome.

Together with the well-known scriptural scholar Carlo Vercellone, he supervised the printing of the Greek text of the Codex Vaticanus, in five volumes (Rome, 1868–81); he also edited other scriptural manuscripts, e.g. the Greek codex of Daniel in the Chigi Library at Rome. His most important scientific work was the publication of some fragments of the Geography of Strabo (Rome, 1884), originally discovered by Cardinal Mai, who was unaware of their importance. We owe also to Cozza-Luzi the publication of the eighth and ninth volumes of Mai's Nova Bibliotheca Patrum, and a part of the cardinal's correspondence.

Among the theological treatises of Cozza-Luzi is an important study on the evidence of the Greek liturgies to the papal supremacy (De Rom. Pont. auctorit. doctrinali testim. liturg. ecclesiæ græcæ, Rome, 1870).

He wrote also on the antiquities of his native Bolsena, on the cathedral of Orvieto, the Vatican collection of Assyrian antiquities, etc. Among his more interesting publications is an edition of the Greek version of St. Gregory the Great's account of St. Benedict (Historia S. P. N. Benedicti a Pontif. Gregorio I descripta et a Zacharia græce reddita, Tivoli, 1880).

He edited the text of Codex Marchalianus (Prophetarum codex Graecus Vaticanus 2125 (Romae, 1890)).

Many of his writings are scattered in various Italian periodicals, ecclesiastical and historical.

Though possessed of a strong intellect and a broad culture, he often lacked scientific accuracy and it is regrettable that no organic plan dominated his numerous studious researches. In addition, he is noted as the author of some falsifications of Giacomo Leopardi (edited in Rome in 1898). The falsity of the sketches was revealed by Sebastiano Timpanaro in 1966.

References 

Italian Roman Catholics
Italian publishers (people)
Italian art historians
1837 births
1905 deaths
Italian antiquarians